Chares of Lindos (gen.: Χάρητος; before 305 BC-c. 280 BC) was a Greek sculptor born on the island of Rhodes. He was a pupil of Lysippos. Chares constructed the Colossus of Rhodes in 282 BC, an enormous bronze statue of the sun god Helios and the patron god of Rhodes. The statue was built to commemorate Rhodes' victory over the invading Macedonians in 305 BC, led by Demetrius I, son of Antigonus, a general under Alexander the Great.
Also attributed to Chares was a colossal head which was brought to Rome and dedicated by P. Lentulus Spinther on the Capitoline Hill, in 57 BC (Pliny, Natural History XXXIV.18).

The Colossus of Rhodes is one of the Seven Wonders of the Ancient World, and was considered Chares's greatest accomplishment, until its destruction in an earthquake in 226 BC.

It is believed that Chares did not live to see his project finished. There are several legends stating that he committed suicide. In one tale he had almost finished the statue when someone pointed out a small flaw in the construction. The sculptor was so ashamed of it he killed himself. 
In another version, the Rhodians asked Chares how much he would charge for a statue fifty feet high, and when he answered, asked him how much for a statue twice as big; he answered twice as much – and they awarded the contract; he had overlooked that doubling the height would mean an eightfold increase in the amount of materials needed.  This drove him to bankruptcy and eventually suicide. The work may have been completed by Laches, also an inhabitant of Lindos.

In popular culture
 L. Sprague de Camp's novel The Bronze God of Rhodes is written as Chares' memoirs of the Siege of Rhodes and the building of the Colossus of Rhodes.
 Asteroid 236746 Chareslindos, discovered by Vincenzo Casulli in 2007, was named after the ancient Greek sculptor. The official  was published by the Minor Planet Center on 4 November 2017.
 Chares, called by the Italian version of his name (Carete), appears in the 1961 film The Colossus of Rhodes, portrayed by Félix Fernández.

References

External links 
 

Hellenistic sculptors
Ancient Rhodian sculptors
3rd-century BC Rhodians
3rd-century BC Greek sculptors
4th-century BC Rhodians
Colossus of Rhodes